McConkie is a surname. Notable people with the surname include:

Bruce R. McConkie (1915–1985), member of the Quorum of the Twelve Apostles of the LDS Church
Joseph Fielding McConkie (1941–2013), emeritus professor of Ancient Scripture at Brigham Young University
Oscar W. McConkie (1887–1966), Utah State Senator and leader in the LDS Church
Oscar W. McConkie, Jr. (1926–2020), American politician and attorney in Utah and leader in the LDS Church
Pace J. McConkie, (born 1962), civil rights lawyer and a professor at Morgan State University

See also
McConkie Tauasa, rugby league player who plays as a centre or on the wing